Charles Frederick Dobson (9 September 1862 – 18 May 1939), known as "Charley Dobson", was an English international footballer, who played as a half back.

Career
Born in Basford, Dobson played for Notts County, and earned one cap for England in 1886. At club level, Dobson made a single appearance for Notts County in The Football League.

Dobson also took part in tours by Corinthians between 1880 and 1884. By the time the Football League started in September 1888 Dobson was only a reserve team player.

Personal life
His older brother, Alfred Dobson, also played football for England.

References

External links

1862 births
1939 deaths
English footballers
England international footballers
Notts County F.C. players
English Football League players
Association football wing halves